In the theory of vector spaces,  a set of vectors is said to be  if there exists no nontrivial linear combination of the vectors that equals the zero vector. If such a linear combination exists, then the vectors are said to be . These concepts are central to the definition of dimension.

A vector space can be of finite dimension or infinite dimension depending on the maximum number of linearly independent vectors.  The definition of linear dependence and the ability to determine whether a subset of vectors in a vector space is linearly dependent are central to determining the dimension of a vector space.

Definition 
A sequence of vectors  from a vector space  is said to be linearly dependent, if there exist scalars  not all zero, such that

where  denotes the zero vector.

This implies that at least one of the scalars is nonzero, say , and the above equation is able to be written as

if  and  if 

Thus, a set of vectors is linearly dependent if and only if one of them is zero or a linear combination of the others.

A sequence of vectors  is said to be linearly independent if it is not linearly dependent, that is, if the equation

Even more concisely, a sequence of vectors is linearly independent if and only if  can be represented as a linear combination of its vectors in a unique way.

If a sequence of vectors contains the same vector twice, it is necessarily dependent. The linear dependency of a sequence of vectors does not depend of the order of the terms in the sequence. This allows defining linear independence for a finite set of vectors: A finite set of vectors is linearly independent if the sequence obtained by ordering them is linearly independent. In other words, one has the following result that is often useful.

A sequence of vectors is linearly independent if  and only if it does not contain the same vector twice and the set of its vectors is linearly independent.

Infinite case
An infinite set of vectors is linearly independent if every nonempty finite subset is linearly independent. Conversely, an infinite set of vectors is linearly dependent if it contains a finite subset that is linearly dependent, or equivalently, if some vector in the set is a linear combination of other vectors in the set.

An indexed family of vectors is linearly independent if it does not contain the same vector twice, and if the set of its vectors is linearly independent. Otherwise, the family is said linearly dependent.

A set of vectors which is linearly independent and spans some vector space, forms a basis for that vector space.

Geometric examples 

The three vectors define a three-dimensional space.

Geographic location 

A person describing the location of a certain place might say, "It is 3 miles north and 4 miles east of here."  This is sufficient information to describe the location, because the geographic coordinate system may be considered as a 2-dimensional vector space (ignoring altitude and the curvature of the Earth's surface).  The person might add, "The place is 5 miles northeast of here."  This last statement is true, but it is not necessary to find the location.    
    
In this example the "3 miles north" vector and the "4 miles east" vector are linearly independent.  That is to say, the north vector cannot be described in terms of the east vector, and vice versa.  The third "5 miles northeast" vector is a linear combination of the other two vectors, and it makes the set of vectors linearly dependent, that is, one of the three vectors is unnecessary to define a specific location on a plane.

Also note that if altitude is not ignored, it becomes necessary to add a third vector to the linearly independent set.  In general,  linearly independent vectors are required to describe all locations in -dimensional space.

Evaluating linear independence

The zero vector 

If one or more vectors from a given sequence of vectors  is the zero vector  then the vector  are necessarily linearly dependent (and consequently, they are not linearly independent). 
Simplifying  gives: 

Because not all scalars are zero (in particular), this proves that the vectors  are linearly dependent.

As a consequence, the zero vector can not possibly belong to any collection of vectors that is linearly independent.

Now consider the special case where the sequence of  has length  (i.e. the case where ). 
A collection of vectors that consists of exactly one vector is linearly dependent if and only if that vector is zero. 
Explicitly, if  is any vector then the sequence  (which is a sequence of length ) is linearly dependent if and only if  alternatively, the collection  is linearly independent if and only if

Linear dependence and independence of two vectors 

Similarly, if  then (2) is true because  
If  (for instance, if they are both equal to the zero vector ) then both (1) and (2) are true (by using  for both).

This shows that if  and  then (1) is true if and only if (2) is true; that is, in this particular case either both (1) and (2) are true (and the vectors are linearly dependent) or else both (1) and (2) are false (and the vectors are linearly independent). 

Vectors in R2 
Three vectors:  Consider the set of vectors   and  then the condition for linear dependence seeks a set of non-zero scalars, such that

or

Row reduce this matrix equation by subtracting the first row from the second to obtain,

Continue the row reduction by (i) dividing the second row by 5, and then (ii) multiplying by 3 and adding to the first row, that is

Rearranging this equation allows us to obtain

or

The same row reduction presented above yields,

This shows that  which means that the vectors v1 = (1, 1) and v2 = (−3, 2) are linearly independent.

Vectors in R4 
In order to determine if the three vectors in  

are linearly dependent, form the matrix equation,

Row reduce this equation to obtain,

Rearrange to solve for v3 and obtain,

This equation is easily solved to define non-zero ai,

where  can be chosen arbitrarily.

Alternative method using determinants 

In this case, the matrix formed by the vectors is

We may write a linear combination of the columns as

We are interested in whether  for some nonzero vector Λ.

Otherwise, suppose we have  vectors of  coordinates, with  Then A is an m×n matrix and Λ is a column vector with  entries, and we are again interested in AΛ = 0. As we saw previously, this is equivalent to a list of  equations. In fact, if  is any list of  rows, then the equation must be true for those rows.

Furthermore, the reverse is true. That is, we can test whether the  vectors are linearly dependent by testing whether

for all possible lists of  rows. (In case , this requires only one determinant, as above. If , then it is a theorem that the vectors must be linearly dependent.) This fact is valuable for theory; in practical calculations more efficient methods are available.

More vectors than dimensions 
If there are more vectors than dimensions, the vectors are linearly dependent. This is illustrated in the example above of three vectors in

Natural basis vectors 

Then  are linearly independent.

Linear independence of functions 

Let  be the vector space of all differentiable functions of a real variable .

Proof 

Take the first derivative of the above equation:

for  values of  We need to show that  and  In order to do this, we subtract the first equation from the second, giving .

Space of linear dependencies 

A linear dependency or linear relation among vectors  is a tuple  with  scalar components such that

If such a linear dependence exists with at least a nonzero component, then the  vectors are linearly dependent. Linear dependencies among  form a vector space.

If the vectors are expressed by their coordinates, then the linear dependencies are the solutions of a homogeneous system of linear equations, with the coordinates of the vectors as coefficients. A basis of the vector space of linear dependencies can therefore be computed by Gaussian elimination.

Generalizations

Affine independence

A set of vectors is said to be affinely dependent if at least one of the vectors in the set can be defined as an affine combination of the others. Otherwise, the set is called affinely independent. Any affine combination is a linear combination; therefore every affinely dependent set is linearly dependent. Conversely, every linearly independent set is affinely independent.

Consider a set of  vectors  of size  each, and consider the set of  augmented vectors  of size  each. The original vectors are affinely independent if and only if the augmented vectors are linearly independent.

Linearly independent vector subspaces

See also

References

External links 
 
 Linearly Dependent Functions at WolframMathWorld.
 Tutorial and interactive program on Linear Independence.
 Introduction to Linear Independence at KhanAcademy.

Abstract algebra
Linear algebra
Articles containing proofs